The 22477 / 22478 Jaipur–Jodhpur Intercity Express is a Superfast train of Intercity Express series belonging to Indian Railways that runs between  and  as a daily service. It is operated by North Western Railway Zone. This train is also known as High Court Express as it connects the capital of Rajasthan, Jaipur with Jodhpur where the High court of Rajasthan is situated.

Coaches
It consists of 1 AC Chair car, 6 Chair car, 6 general second and 2 guard cum luggage vans. The total composition is 15 coaches. LHB rake was introduced for this train from 31 January 2014.

22477
Runs daily from

22478
Runs daily from

Traction
It is hauled by a Bhagat Ki Kothi Diesel Loco Shed-based WDP-4 / WDP-4B / WDP-4D locomotive from Jaipur to Jodhpur and vice versa.

References

Transport in Jodhpur
Transport in Jaipur
Rail transport in Rajasthan
Railway services introduced in 2014
Intercity Express (Indian Railways) trains